Chasmanthera is a genus of flowering plants belonging to the family Menispermaceae.

Its native range is Tropical Africa.

Species:

Chasmanthera dependens 
Chasmanthera uviformis 
Chasmanthera welwitschii

References

Menispermaceae
Menispermaceae genera